James Daudi Lembeli (born 26 December 1956) is a Tanzanian politician who served as a Member of Parliament for Kahama constituency from 2005 to 2015 via the ruling Chama Cha Mapinduzi (CCM) party.

On 18 July 2015, he announced that he would not defend his electoral seat through the ruling party. Three days later, he announced his decision to defect to the opposition Chadema party.

References

1956 births
Living people
Chama Cha Mapinduzi MPs
Tanzanian MPs 2010–2015
Njombe Secondary School alumni